Marcin Piotr Czepelak (born 14 July 1978, Gliwice) is a Polish jurist who serves as a Secretary-General of the Permanent Court of Arbitration, the Hague. Previously, he was ambassador of Poland to the Netherlands (2017–2022).

Education 
Marcin Czepelak has graduated from law at the Jagiellonian University. In 2006 he defended his Ph.D. thesis on international agreements. The dissertation won the Prime Minister’s award for the best thesis. In 2016, he was awarded post-doctoral degree (habilitation) on the basis of his monograph Party autonomy in the EU Private International Law.

Besides Polish, he speaks English, French, German and Spanish.

Career 
He was working in the Kraków Town Hall. He is the associate professor of the Jagiellonian University where he gives lectures on the law of international agreements, private international law and the international law of succession. He has been participating in research projects at the Max Planck Institute in Hamburg and the University of Cambridge. He completed internship at The Hague Academy of International Law.  He specializes in international civil procedure, the protection of foreign investments and the law of treaties. He publishes in Polish, English and Italian.

On 22 June 2017 he was appointed Poland Ambassador to the Netherlands. On 12 September he presented his credentials to king Willem-Alexander of the Netherlands. He has also been accredited to the Organisation for the Prohibition of Chemical Weapons. He ended his term on 31 May 2022. On 14 February 2022 he started his 5-year term as a Secretary-General of the Permanent Court of Arbitration, the Hague.

Works 

 Autonomia woli w prawie prywatnym międzynarodowym Unii Europejskiej (Party autonomy in the EU Private International Law), Warszawa: Poltext, 2015, .
 Międzynarodowe prawo zobowiązań Unii Europejskiej. Komentarz do rozporządzeń rzymskich (International Law of Obligations of the European Union. Commentary on the Rome Regulations), Warszawa: LexisNexis, 2012, .
 Umowa międzynarodowa jako źródło prawa prywatnego międzynarodowego, Warszawa: Wolters Kluwer Polska, 2008, .
 Stosunki majątkowe między małżonkami w prawie prywatnym międzynarodowym, Kraków: Krakowskie Towarzystwo Edukacyjne, 2004.

References 

1978 births
Living people
Ambassadors of Poland to the Netherlands
Members of the Permanent Court of Arbitration
Jagiellonian University alumni
Academic staff of Jagiellonian University
People from Gliwice
Polish legal scholars